Canfield Speedway is a half mile dirt oval racetrack that hosted (major) sanctioned auto racing from 1950 to 1964, but other associations ran until the late 1970s.  There was also a 1/4 mile dirt racing surface that shared the front stretch with the 1/2 mile track.  It was used until the track was closed to auto racing in 1973. Attendance varied from 30,000 people for larger events to 10,000 people for ones of less significance. The track is located at the Canfield Fairgrounds in Canfield, Ohio, and is still in use today, primarily during the Canfield Fair.

History
The original promoter of auto racing in Canfield was Charlie Findlay and then his nephew George C. Findlay in the early 1960s. It was Charlie that had close ties with Johnny Marcum, (MARC) Midwest Association of Racing Cars and Canfield Speedway was the priority track. In 1964 ARCA took over MARC as the desire for dirt tracks died out.

Races
It was on the NASCAR Grand National Schedule for three years from 1950 to 1952 hosting one event annually over that time period. The NASCAR Grand National and Short Track series competed there as well as ARCA and USAC. The Short Track Race was 100 laps and the track was 1/4-mile long making the race . The ARCA races were either 100 laps on the 1/4-mile or 200, 250, or 300 laps on the 1/2-mile as the track had two different configurations. Some of the events used the inverted start with the pole qualifier starting last. Both USAC races were 100 laps on the quarter mile configuration.

Records
The quickest laps recorded in sanctioned events were just under the 24 second mark with cars averaging  around the speedway on the half mile configuration. On the quarter mile quick time was under 16 seconds and cars averaged . The record for cautions is 4 and smallest margin of victory  and the largest 3 laps. The largest purse was $4350 and the most lead changes was 2.

Table of NASCAR Sanctioned Events

Table of ARCA & USAC Events

1950 Race #5 Top 5 Results for First Race

Bill Rexford 

Bill Rexford won the inaugural event (later known as the Poor Man's 500) and went on to take the Grand National Championship that year in 1950. He was the youngest diver to win the championship in what is now the NASCAR Cup Series. He was aided to the championship when Lee Petty was stripped of some points for racing in non-NASCAR sanctioned events. His only lead lap finish in his career was at Canfield Speedway (when he won). His only career pole came at Canfield Speedway the following year in 1951. He was the 1st of 6 drivers to win a championship without winning a pole in that season. He is 1 of 4 drivers to win a championship with only 1 win that season (nobody has won with 0 wins). In the three grand national races only 4 cars combined finished on the lead lap.

References

Sources 
http://www.ultimateracinghistory.com/racelist3.php?trackid=104
http://www.racing-reference.info/tracks?id=113
http://www.racing-reference.info/trackdet?trk=113&series=W&show=1
http://jacobsusa.com/cjsspeed/nascar/tracks/canfield_speedway.shtml
http://www.nascar.com/
https://archive.today/20070810193516/http://community.nascar.com/blogs/14457
http://www.legendsofnascar.com/Bill_Rexford.htm 
http://www.legendsofnascar.com/Jimmy_Florian.htm
http://www.race-database.com/track/track.php?track_id=Canfield
https://web.archive.org/web/20081118201153/http://www.jayski.com/pages/tracks/bgntracks.htm
https://web.archive.org/web/20120831041056/http://www.jayski.com/stats/winbynum.htm
The Stock Car Racing Encyclopedia,
Canfield Speedway: A Photo Journey 1946-1973

Buildings and structures in Mahoning County, Ohio
Motorsport venues in Ohio
NASCAR tracks
Tourist attractions in Mahoning County, Ohio